Coffee Ani Barach Kahi is a Marathi-language directed and produced by Prakash Kunte. Stars Vaibhav Tatwawaadi , Prarthana Behere , Neha Mahajan , Bhushan Pradhan and Suyash Tilak.film released on 3 April 2015.

Synopsis 
The story of a relationship seen from the different perspectives of two young people. Jaai and Nishad find it difficult to reconcile the feelings they have for each other as they navigate their misunderstandings.

Cast 
 Vaibhav Tatwawaadi as Nishad
 Prarthana Behere as Jaai
 Neha Mahajan as Abha (Jaai's Younger Sister)
 Bhushan Pradhan as Anish
 Suyash Tilak as Nikhil
 Sandesh Kulkarni as Paresh (Coffee Shop Manager)
 Anita Date-Kelkar
 Vidyadhar Joshi as Jaai's Father
 Ashwini Ekbote as Jaai's Mother
 Avinash Narkar as Nishad's Father
 Ila Bhate as Nikhil's Mother

Soundtrack

The music of the film is composed by Late Shri Gajanan Valve and Aditya Bedekar with lyrics are penned by Mangesh Padgaonkar and Yogesh Damle. Aditya Bedekar makes his debut with this film.

Track listing

Critical reception 
Coffee Ani Barach Kahi received Positive reviews from critics. A Reviewer of Maharashtra Times gave the film 3.5 stars out of 5 and says "Prakash Kunte has given a good package in his first movie. Only the life of the story they chose is not very long. The length of the movie seems long in comparison. Sometimes it lingers. But this slowness is overshadowed by the freshness of the arrangement, the music". A Reviewer of Loksatta wrote "Despite being a manageable love story, it is bombarded with songs and avoids the 'typical' scenes of love stories that the audience has seen thousands of times on the silver screen". A Reviewer of Divya Marathi wrote "A beautiful love story has blossomed. However, the film still feels like it moves too slowly. 2 hours are given to tell a story that can be told in 20 minutes or half an hour. This is a family watchable movie".

References

External links 
 

2015 films
2010s Marathi-language films